Workhouse infirmaries were established in the nineteenth century in England.  They developed from the Workhouse and were run under the Poor law regime.

The 1832 Royal Commission into the Operation of the Poor Laws recommended separate workhouses for the aged and infirm.  Clause 45 of the Poor Law Amendment Act 1834 established that lunatics could not be held in a workhouse for more than a fortnight.

1840s–1870
 
Workhouse residents were provided with free medical care, which was not available to those outside. Every Poor Law Union had a medical officer. Most workhouses had a small infirmary block, but nursing was in the hands of the other inmates, most of whom could not read.

Where workhouses had been designed for the indigent, by the late 1840s most workhouses outside London and the larger provincial towns housed only "the incapable, elderly and sick". Standards of care were increasingly criticised:

The Workhouse Visiting Society was set up in 1858 exposed the poor standards of nursing care.

The 1867 report to Gathorne Hardy by Uvedale Corbett and Dr. W. O. Markham, after the scandal around the death of Timothy Daly, a resident of Holborn Workhouse Infirmary, recommended that: 

After the Metropolitan Poor Act 1867 more infirmaries were built in and around London.  The act permitted the employment of probationary nurses who were trained for a year in the sick asylums. These nurses gradually began to replace the employment of untrained paupers who had provided what little nursing care there was. In 1869 there were about 50,000 sick paupers in workhouses. An inspector observed that the Southwark workhouse "does not meet the requirements of medical science, nor am I able to suggest any arrangements which would in the least enable it to do so". By the middle of the 19th century there was a growing realisation that the purpose of the workhouse was no longer solely or even chiefly to act as a deterrent to the able-bodied poor, and the first generation of buildings was widely considered to be inadequate. About 150 new workhouses were built mainly in London, Lancashire and Yorkshire between 1840 and 1875. These new buildings often had long corridors with separate wards leading off for men, women and children.

1871–1900
Responsibility for administration of the Poor Law passed to the Local Government Board in 1871, and the emphasis shifted from the workhouse as "a receptacle for the helpless poor" to its role in the care of the sick and helpless. The Diseases Prevention Act of 1883 allowed workhouse infirmaries to offer treatment to non-paupers as well as inmates, and by the beginning of the 20th century some infirmaries were even able to operate as private hospitals. By the end of the century only about 20 per cent admitted to workhouses were unemployed or destitute, but about 30 per cent of the population over 70 were in workhouses.

1900–1930
In 1901 there were 3,170 paid nurses employed in workhouses, with about 2,000 probationers - about one nurse for 20 patients. They normally worked a 70 hour week with two weeks paid holiday a year. In 1911 there were more than 100,000 sick in workhouses.
	
The Royal Commission of 1905 reported that workhouses were unsuited to deal with the different categories of resident they had traditionally housed, and recommended that specialised institutions for each class of pauper should be established, in which they could be treated appropriately by properly trained staff. The "deterrent" workhouses were in future to be reserved for "incorrigibles such as drunkards, idlers and tramps". The Local Government Act 1929 gave local authorities the power to take over workhouse infirmaries as municipal hospitals, although outside London few did so. The workhouse system was abolished in the UK by the same Act on 1 April 1930, but many workhouses, renamed Public Assistance Institutions, continued under the control of local county councils.

1930–1948
Even in 1939 there were still almost 100,000 people accommodated in the former workhouses, 5,629 of whom were children. It was not until the 1948 National Assistance Act that the last vestiges of the Poor Law disappeared, and with them the workhouses. Many of the buildings were converted into old folks' homes run by local authorities; slightly more than 50 per cent of local authority accommodation for the elderly was provided in former workhouses in 1960. Camberwell workhouse (in Peckham, South London) continued until 1985 as a shelter for more than 1000 homeless men, operated by the Department of Health and Social Security and renamed a resettlement centre. Southwell workhouse, now a museum, was used to provide temporary accommodation for mothers and children until the early 1990s.

In 1937 there were about 27,000 female nurses and 30,000 probationers working in the Poor law and municipal hospitals.

See also
:Category:Poor law infirmaries

References

 
Poverty in England